The Matrícula Consular de Alta Seguridad (MCAS) (Consular Identification Card) is an identification card issued by the Government of Mexico through its consulate offices to Mexican nationals residing outside of Mexico. Also known as the Mexican CID card, it has been issued since 1871. The issue of the card has no bearing on immigration status in the foreign country they are residing in.  The purpose of the card is to demonstrate that the bearer is a Mexican national living outside of Mexico. It includes a Government of Mexico issued ID number and bears a photograph and address outside of Mexico of the Mexican National to whom it is issued.

Use in the United States
Several U.S. states, municipalities, and businesses accept the Matricula Consular as an official form of identification. Two million Mexican CIDs were issued in 2002–2003.  A number of countries have followed suit including Guatemala, Brazil, and Ecuador.  Other countries are considering the program, including: Colombia, El Salvador, Guatemala, Honduras, Nicaragua, and Peru.  "Peru has specifically cited the acceptance of the Mexican CID card in the United States as a factor contributing to its interest in issuing a CID card."  The Vienna Convention on Consular Relations defines consular functions to include issuing passports and travel documents, and the U.S. Department of State accepts that the issuing of CID cards is a permissible consular function.

On September 14, 2004, the United States Congress voted down a motion to prevent financial institutions from accepting consular IDs. Representative Tom Price announced that the Committee on Financial Services would be convening hearings on the methods permitted by the United States Department of the Treasury applying to the use of the Matricula Consular by banking institutions for the purposes of verification of identity.

The "FDIC says about $18 billion is wired annually from the U.S. to Mexico. Many U.S. banks have welcomed the IDs as a way to get a cut of this activity by profiting from the handling charges on the wires and increased deposits."

Security issues 
Former New Jersey Representative Scott Garrett (Republican) stated that the use of MCAS (Matrícula Consular de Alta Seguridad?) cards by undocumented immigrants weakens the measures established by the U.S. Congress after "9/11 to safeguard American businesses and financial institutions against fraud and abuse".  U.S. law enforcement officials also cite that Matricula Consular cards are issued by Mexican Consulate without checking the authenticity of the applicant's supporting documentation. In testimony to the Senate Judiciary Committee, the Federal Bureau of Investigation (FBI) disclosed and reported that the Matricula Consular card is inherently unreliable and unverifiable as an identification card and is highly vulnerable to fraud, regardless of its security features. The FBI reported that because Mexico lacks a centralized database for their CIDs, they are unable to prevent an individual from receiving multiple CIDs and cannot access information about a CID applicant's identity.  An FBI agent said that "Mexican consulates issued CID cards to individuals lacking any proof of identification, as long as they fill out a questionnaire and satisfy the consular official that they are who they claim to be." U.S. federal and local drug enforcement agents have discovered that numerous non-citizen narcotics traffickers obtain Matricula Consular cards using aliases and that their use in the United States presents the U.S. with a serious criminal threat.

In a 2003 letter to the Homeland Security Secretary Tom Ridge by the U.S. House Chairmen of the Homeland Security Committee, the Judiciary Committee, the Appropriations Subcommittee on Homeland Security, and the Judiciary Subcommittee on Courts, the Internet, & Intellectual Property, it was written that the Matricula Consular "can be a perfect breeder document for establishing a false identity".  They warned that criminals could exploit the cards to conceal their identity as well as launder money and write fraudulent checks. They went on to point out that any acceptance of the cards by the Federal government "compromises our homeland security" by providing an opportunity for terrorists to freely move about the U.S., board planes and transfer funds for terrorist activities.

In January 2003, Nancy Pelosi, the ranking Democrat in the U.S. House of Representatives, pushed for a trial arrangement to give holders of Matricula Consular cards access to the Phillip Burton Federal Building in San Francisco. Due to national security concerns, other members of Congress later revoked the privilege by the summer of 2003. In response to this, Pelosi argued that the vote to restrict the use of the Matrícula Consular was "anti-Hispanic" and that "We in San Francisco know that the Matrícula Consular works". The Matricula Consular card has been embraced by the Democratic Caucus. The Mayor of San Francisco established a policy in December 2001 for the city and county of San Francisco to accept the Mexican CID as a valid form of ID. The mayor's office issued a press release stating that the card would prevent those in the Mexican immigrant community lacking an acceptable identification from being jailed or deported when committing minor offenses.

The U.S. Department of Agriculture warned that the Matricula Consular card is not sufficient to determine legal immigration status nor eligibility for the U.S. Food Stamp Program. The department also advised that home addresses on these cards may not be current "given the potential mobility of this population".

Bank on California, a program launched by Governor Arnold Schwarzenegger in December 2008, encourages financial institutions to accept the Mexican CID, Guatemalan CID and other CID cards as primary identification for opening bank accounts.

The Center for Immigration Studies, a conservative research organization, argued in a research brief that the Matricula is becoming a shield that hides criminal activity for two reasons: first, the holder's identity was not verified when the card was issued, and second, police in jurisdictions that accept the Matricula are less likely to run background checks on card holders picked up for minor infractions. The organization claimed that the Matricula consular is useful in the United States only for the undocumented, since legal immigrants, have U.S. government-issued documents, and that the objective the card's supporters is to achieve quasi-legal status for "Mexican illegals in the United States".

Anti-immigration activists also claimed the Federal government of Mexico responded to the September 11 attacks by aggressively lobbying for the ID.

Mexican Consular Identification Card 
The Mexican Consular Identification Card, known as Mátricula Consular de Alta Seguridad (MCAS) in Spanish, is a proof of nationality certificate issued by a Mexican Consular Office that verifies that the bearer is registered as a resident in its consular district. It is issued in accordance with Mexican privacy law and international legal instruments signed by Mexico and the United States such as the Vienna Convention on Consular Relations of 1963.

Mexican Consulates have historically issued these ID cards to their nationals who reside in the United States, regardless of whether they are permanent residents, or have dual citizenship or other status. The practice is widely followed throughout the world, and the United States and Mexico are just two of the 180 countries that have ratified the Vienna Convention.

Many other countries around the world also choose to document their consular registries with identification cards to prove that every registered person is:

1)    a national of the issuing country and

2)    registered with the respective consulate or embassy. 

Article 5 (d) of the Vienna Convention on Consular Relations defines consular functions to include the issuance of documents to nationals of the sending state. Furthermore, subsections (g) and (h) of the treaty say that consulates should safeguard the interests of their nationals, particularly in the case of death or minors.  Consular identification cards are a part of this process.  

Requirements

Mexicans living abroad who request a Consular Identification Card must submit these three documents:

·        a document that proves Mexican nationality,

·        an official identification card with a photo and

·        a document that proves their place of residence within the corresponding consular district.  

The Mexican Consular Identification Card cannot be issued to a person who faces a judicial or administrative process in Mexico.

Background

In 2002, the Mexican Government created the Consular Identification Card and Mexican Consulates in the United States started to issue these ID cards.  In 2006, the security of the ID card was improved by the addition of biometrics, decoded information using two-dimensional (2D) bar codes and security measures in accordance with international standards.

In 2014, the Mexican Ministry of Foreign Affairs introduced a new format for the Consular Identification Card that further improved its security and not only met U.S. identification security standards but, in some cases, surpassed them. The new security features of the Consular Identification Card include:

·        a Guilloché design (a complex, repetitive pattern to avoid forgery),

·        a laser-engraved element,

·        Ghost images,

·        UV elements,

·        2D bar codes,

·        Pearlescent ink,

·        Preprinted microtexts and nanotexts,

·        Proprietary security holographic laminates and

·        a cryptographic chip with encrypted data.

The Arizona Case

The Mexican Consular Identification Card is currently recognized as proof of identity by many banks, financial institutions and police departments, as well as federal, state and local authorities in Mexico and the U.S. This acceptance not only supports the work of law enforcement agencies, it also offers certainty to business transactions.

The use of these ID cards is definitely good for the local Arizona economy. Hispanics currently represent 31.7% of Arizona’s population, and 27.8% of those residents are of Mexican origin. Mexicans represent more than 52% of the total foreign-born population in Arizona, and there are 35 Mexican companies that employ more than 8,000 people in the state. 

Members of the Mexican community can use these ID cards for business transactions, which will make it easier to use formal financial services. They also can use the cards to obtain loans, open businesses or acquire property. Because remittances to Mexico are sent through financial institutions or money transfer operators, the growth and profitability of the U.S. remittance market also has been strengthened by the use of these highly secure ID cards.

History of MCAS in Arizona

Unfortunately, these Consular ID cards were not always accepted in Arizona. In 2011, Arizona Senate Bill SB1465 prohibited the state of Arizona or any of its political subdivisions from accepting the Mexican Consular Identification Card as a valid and legal form of identification. The main argument was a lack of perceived security and reliability

In the last decade, there has been lengthy and complex work done to get the Consular Identification Card accepted again in Arizona.

In 2015, Arizona Gov. Doug Ducey issued an important proclamation recognizing Mexico’s major role as Arizona’s number one trading partner. Gov. Ducey exhorted the Arizona State Legislature to review and reconsider SB1465.

Since Consul General Jorge Mendoza Yescas was appointed in 2019, the Mexican Consulate in Phoenix organized a number of official visits with local authorities to discuss the benefits of the Consular ID card in terms of the local economy, security and law enforcement. The official visits included, among others, 30 Arizona mayors and 30 police officers, seven county sheriffs, several state legislators, chambers of commerce and members of academia.

In 2020, those intense efforts paid off when former state Rep. Tony Rivero, state Rep. David Cook and state Sen. Paul Boyer collaborated with the Mexican Consulate to present a new bill to recognize the Consular Identification Card. Finally, on February 24, 2021, the Arizona State Legislature approved AZ SB1420 (Consular identification; validity; biometric verification), which was promoted by state Sen. Boyer.

On March 5, 2021, Gov. Doug Ducey signed the new bill, which allow authorities in Arizona to accept consular ID cards such as MCAS, into law.

Mexico's consular network in Arizona is made up of two Consulates General (Phoenix and Nogales) and three Consulates (Douglas, Tucson and Yuma).

SOURCES

SB1465

https://www.azleg.gov/legtext/50leg/1r/bills/sb1465s.pdf

Proclamation of Gov. Doug Ducey (2015)

https://apps.azsos.gov/public_services/register/2015/40/27_governor_proclamations.pdf

Acceptation of SB1420

https://www.azcentral.com/story/news/politics/arizona/2021/03/05/gov-ducey-signs-consular-id-bill-into-law/4600006001/

References

External links
 Description of the Matricula Consular de Alta Seguridad
 Description of the Matricula Consular de Alta Seguridad

Consular identification cards
Foreign relations of Mexico
Identity documents of Mexico